Sverker is a studio album by Neo-Medieval group Corvus Corax.

Track listing

 "Intro Gjallarhorni" - 0:58
 "Gjallarhorni" - 2:59
 "Sverker" - 4:31
 "Fiach Dubh" - 6:38
 "Trinkt vom Met" - 0:35
 "The drinking loving dancers" - 5:19
 "Lá í mBealtaine" - 4:47
 "Havfrue" - 4:36
 "Baldr" - 3:27
 "Ragnarök" - 7:40
 "Tjugundi bidil" - 0:27
 "Na Láma-sa" - 9:18

Credits 
 Wim Dobbrisch - bagpipes, shawm, bucina, vocals
 Castus Karsten Liehm - bagpipes, shawn, bucina, sistrum, vocals
 Hatz - big frame drum, cymbals, cassa, vocals
 Norri Drescher - big frame drum, bass drum, string drum, tam tam, vocals
 PanPeter - bagpipes
 Vit - bagpipes
 Steve the machine - percussion

References

External links 
 
 Corvus Corax at Reverbnation
 Sverker at Rateyourmusic
 Sverker at Discogs

2011 albums
Corvus Corax (band) albums
Medieval music albums